Vesel Demaku (born 5 February 2000) is an Austrian professional footballer who plays as a midfielder for Austria Klagenfurt on loan from Sturm Graz.

Club career
On 27 March 2017, Demaku joined FK Austria Wien from FC Red Bull Salzburg's youth academy, and signed his first professional contract. Demaku made his professional debut for Austria Wien in a 4–0 Austrian Bundesliga win over SKN St. Pölten on 10 March 2018.

On 1 December 2022, Demaku moved on loan to Austria Klagenfurt for the second part of the 2022–23 season.

International career
Demaku was born in Austria and is of Kosovo Albanian descent. He is a youth international for Austria.

References

External links
 
 OEFB National Profile
 Fussball Osterreich Profile
 FK Austria Profile

2000 births
Austrian people of Kosovan descent
Austrian people of Albanian descent
People from Baden District, Austria
Footballers from Lower Austria
Living people
Association football midfielders
Austrian footballers
Austria youth international footballers
Austria under-21 international footballers
FK Austria Wien players
SK Sturm Graz players
SK Austria Klagenfurt players
Austrian Football Bundesliga players
2. Liga (Austria) players
Austrian Regionalliga players